Raymond C. "Ray" Bonin (born November 20, 1942) is a former Canadian politician. He was a Liberal member of the House of Commons of Canada, representing the riding of Nickel Belt, from 1993 to 2008. Prior to entering politics, he was a teacher at Sudbury's Cambrian College. He was also chairman of the French Catholic school board from 1976 to 1985, and was a city councillor from 1988 to 1991.

On November 16, 2006, Bonin announced that he would not run for reelection in the 2008 federal election. Former Greater Sudbury city councillor Louise Portelance won the nomination to stand as the new Liberal candidate for Nickel Belt, but was defeated by Claude Gravelle of the New Democratic Party on election day.

References

External links
 https://www.ourcommons.ca/members/en/raymond-bonin(823)#roles
 https://lop.parl.ca/sites/ParlInfo/default/en_CA/People/Profile?personId=14354

1942 births
Franco-Ontarian people
Liberal Party of Canada MPs
Living people
Members of the House of Commons of Canada from Ontario
Sudbury, Ontario city councillors
21st-century Canadian politicians